MVHS could mean:

Health 
 Minnesota Valley Humane Society
Mohawk Valley Health System

Schools 
 Mission Vista High School
 Marsh Valley High School
 Mercy Vocational High School
 Merrimack Valley High School
 Metea Valley High School
 Michigan Virtual High School
 Mission Viejo High School
 Moapa Valley High School
 Mountain Valley High School
 Monta Vista High School
 Monte Vista High School (disambiguation)
 Monument Valley High School (disambiguation)
 Mount Vernon High School (disambiguation)
 Mount View High School (disambiguation)
 Mountain View High School (disambiguation)
 Mountain Vista High School
 Murrieta Valley High School
 Minisink Valley High School